All Our Yesterdays is a television series, produced by Granada Television, giving an historical account of the 1930s lead-up to the Second World War and to the war itself.  It relied on film footage, and may be considered a precursor to the later Thames Television World at War production.

The series ran weekly from 1960 to 1973 and from 1987 to 1989. The format was a studio commentary, supported by newsreel clips that had been shown in cinemas 25 years ago that week. The final series concentrated on 1939. The years to 1964 focused on the build-up to the Second World War, mixed with more lighthearted fare. The series continued mostly with war footage from 1964 to 1970. A measure of comic relief was provided by wartime cartoons, especially by Osbert Lancaster for the Daily Express, with captions read by actors.

The presenters were:
 James Cameron (1960 to 1961)
 Brian Inglis (1961 to 1973)
 Bernard Braden (1987 to 1989)

One wartime newsreel which found a new audience was "Hoch der Lambeth Valk". This propaganda film of a Nazi rally, with goose-stepping parades, had been re-edited, reversing some sequences, so the marchers appeared to be dancing "The Lambeth Walk". The effect became a favourite.

Only 47 episodes of the original series (1960–1973) survive whereas the later series (1987–89) survives complete. The title of this series alludes to Macbeth's soliloquy in Act 5 Scene 5 after Lady Macbeth's death.

External links

Hoch der Lambeth Valk at the National Archive.

1960 British television series debuts
1989 British television series endings
1960s British documentary television series
1970s British documentary television series
1980s British documentary television series
ITV documentaries
British television documentaries
Television series by ITV Studios
Television shows produced by Granada Television
English-language television shows
Documentary television series about World War II